The 1st Canadian Infantry Brigade was a Canadian Army formation that served with the 1st Canadian Division in World Wars I and II. In 1953 it was reformed in Germany, to become the 1 Canadian Mechanized Brigade Group in 1992.

William Antrobus Griesbach commanded the brigade in 1918.

Order of Battle

World War I 
1st Canadian Battalion (Ontario Regiment), CEF. August 1914 – November 11, 1918;
2nd Canadian Battalion (Eastern Ontario Regiment), CEF. August 1914 – November 11, 1918;
3rd Canadian Battalion (Toronto Regiment), CEF. August 1914 – November 11, 1918;
4th (Central Ontario) Battalion, CEF. August 1914 – November 11, 1918.

World War II 

 The Royal Canadian Regiment
 The Hastings and Prince Edward Regiment
 48th Highlanders of Canada
 1st Canadian Infantry Brigade Ground Defence Platoon (Lorne Scots)

Post-1945 
The brigade was re-established on 14 October 1953 in Europe.
1st Canadian Infantry Brigade created 14 October 1953
Redesignated 1st Canadian Infantry Brigade Group in October 1955
Redesignated 1 Combat Group in 1972
Redesignated 1 Canadian Brigade Group in 1976
Redesignated 1 Canadian Mechanized Brigade Group in 1992

References

Infantry brigades of the Canadian Army
Military units and formations established in 1914
Military units and formations disestablished in 1972
Canadian World War II brigades
Canadian World War I brigades